No.4 Basic Education High School Taunggyi , is a high school in Taunggyi Township, Shan State, Myanmar . It has 8 main campuses, numbered Pin Ma 1 to Pin Ma 8. The school has over 100 teachers, and over 3,000 students.

High schools in Shan State
Principals

Principals

Oo Judson Aung (1946-1947)

Oo Than Phay(1947-1948)

Oo Sein Phay(1948-1952)

Oo Mg Mg(1953-1957)

Oo Moses Aung Thwin(1958-)

Oo Kyaw Hla(1956-1965) 

Daw Saw Hla(1965-1971)

Oo Nyo Htun(1971-1986)

Daw Aye Chit(1986-2001)

Oo Khin Mg Myint(2001-2005)

Oo Nyo Lone(2006-2009)

Daw Sao Kyi Win(2009-2014)

Oo Mya Than(2014-2020).